Maurice Foster may refer to:
Maurice Foster (politician) (1933–2010), Canadian politician
Maurice Foster (cricketer, born 1943), West Indies cricketer
Maurice Foster (English cricketer) (1889–1940), English cricketer